Christian Laurin (born June 1, 1964) is a Canadian film, television and stage actor who performs in both English and French productions.

Early life 
Born in Montreal, Quebec, and raised in Toronto, Ontario, Laurin received his training at the Neighborhood Playhouse school of theatre in New York City, where he was taught acting by the renowned Sanford Meisner.

Career 
He has had numerous roles in a variety of American and Canadian productions including The Sopranos, Covert One: The Hades Factor, The Pacifier, Murdoch Mysteries and recurring or leading roles in the TV series Météo+,  Les Bleus de Ramville, St. Nickel and Hard Rock Medical.

On stage he was seen in numerous theatre productions such as Michel Tremblay's "Yours Forever Marie-Lou", produced by Soulpepper Theatre Company, Melissa James Gibson's "This", Yasmina Reza's "God of Carnage", Michel Tremblay's Fragments of Useless Lies, directed by Diana Leblanc, The Hollow at the Canadian Stage in the role of Drasiw, and in Molière's The Imaginary Invalid directed by Dean Gilmour. He also performs solo shows as Rutabagan, a bouffon-style clown.

Personal life 
He has also toured extensively across the United States and Europe with theatre companies such as Mump and Smoot in the production of Something Else with Zug, directed by Karen Hines, and also with Theatre Smith-Gilmour.

References

External links 
 
 Christian Laurin acting reel

1964 births
Living people
Canadian male film actors
Canadian male television actors
Canadian male voice actors
Canadian male stage actors
Canadian clowns
French Quebecers
Male actors from Montreal